Sojiwan (Javanese orthography: Såjiwan, or sometimes spelled Sajiwan) is a 9th-century Mahayana Buddhist temple located in Kebon Dalem Kidul village, Prambanan, Klaten Regency, Central Java. The temple is located nearly two kilometres southeast of Prambanan temple. This temple is among numbers of temples scattered in Prambanan Plain.

History

The Rukam inscription dated 829 Saka (907 CE) currently stored in National Museum of Indonesia mentioned about the inauguration of Rukam village restoration by Nini Haji Rakryan Sanjiwana, previously the village was being devastated by volcanic eruption. In return, the inhabitant of Rukam village was obliged to take care of a sacred building located in Limwung. This sacred building was identified as Sojiwan temple, while the name of the royal patron mentioned in this inscription: Nini Haji Rakryan Sanjiwana, was identified as Queen Pramodhawardhani, the temple bears her name Sajiwan and believed to be dedicated for her. The temple was built between 842 and 850 CE, approximately built in the same era with Plaosan temple nearby.

Sojiwan temple was rediscovered in 1813 by Colonel Colin Mackenzie, a subordinate of Sir Stamford Raffles. He examined the archaeological remains around Prambanan plain and rediscovered the ruins of wall surrounding the temple. The temple was left in ruins for decades until the government launched the reconstruction effort started in 1996. Since 1999 the temple become the training and education center for temple reconstruction project. During the reconstruction the excavation discovered wall structure surrounding the temple and also stone paved causeway in front of the temple. In 2006 the reconstruction project was halted and took a major blow because of earthquake, caused the reconstructed building parts and scaffolding collapsed. The reconstruction project completed in December 2011, inaugurated by Mari Pangestu, Indonesian Minister of Tourism and Creative Economy. The reconstruction took 15 years and 8.27 billion rupiah cost.

Architecture

The temple was made of andesite stone, its size, style and form is similar to those of Mendut temple near Borobudur. The temple complex measures 8,140 square meters,  with main building measures 401.3 square meters and 27 meters high. The base of the temple contains 20 bas-reliefs connected to the Buddhist stories of Pancatantra or Jatakas from India. From these 20 reliefs 19 remain. The stairway is flanked with two large makaras. The inner chamber of the temple contains two niches and lotus pedestals, originally host Buddha and Bodhisattva statues. However currently the chamber is empty. The temples roof took form of stepped pyramid crowned with stupas.

During restoration project the excavation works discovered two rows of walls surrounding the temple, located 14 meters and 30 meters from the main temple. Other discovery includes paved pathways, stairs and temple stone block fragments surrounding main temple, suggested that Sojiwan was a temple complex, there were perwara temples (lesser complementary temples) once stood within the temple complex.

References
 Jan Rambout van Blom, 1935, Tjandi Sadjiwan. Leiden-Amsterdam: Stenfert Kroese.
 Marijke Klokke, 1993, The Tantri Reliefs on Ancient Javanese Candi. Leiden: KITLV Press. .

Location
from wikimapia

References

See also

 Candi of Indonesia
 Indonesian Esoteric Buddhism
 Plaosan

Buddhist temples in Indonesia
Archaeological sites in Indonesia
Prambanan
Mataram Kingdom
Cultural Properties of Indonesia in Central Java
Religious buildings and structures in Central Java
9th-century Buddhist temples